The Great Smoky Mountains Parkway is a highway that travels  between the Great Smoky Mountains National Park and Interstate 40 in Kodak, Tennessee, in East Tennessee. It serves as the main thoroughfare for Gatlinburg, Pigeon Forge, and Sevierville, and includes a  spur of the Foothills Parkway. It is composed of sections of a number of numbered highways, including U.S. routes 441 and 321 and state routes 66 and 448.

The parkway serves as the primary means of access to the Great Smoky Mountains National Park, the most visited national park in the United States, and the numerous tourist attractions located within the cities of Sevierville, Pigeon Forge, and Gatlinburg. The parkway is one of the most congested non-freeway routes in the state, carrying more than 50,000 vehicles per day in some locations.

Route description
Most of the Great Smoky Mountains Parkway is a divided highway, except for the segment south of Gatlinburg, which carries little traffic. Most of the parkway has been widened to six lanes, and is one of the most congested arterial routes in the state. The road is simply called "Parkway" in Pigeon Forge and Gatlinburg, where most of the commercial land development has occurred in those two cities.
Both have numbered each traffic light sequentially to make it easier for non-locals to find their hotels and other tourist attractions. Sevierville has its traffic lights numbered in miles and tenths, according to the mileage from the national park boundary.

The Great Smoky Mountains Parkway begins as a segment of US 441 at the Tennessee-North Carolina state line in the Great Smoky Mountains National Park a few miles south of Gatlinburg. Entering Gatlinburg, the route widens to four lanes as an undivided arterial route. In downtown Gatlinburg, the route turns north at an intersection with US 321, beginning a wrong-way concurrency with that route.

Leaving Gatlinburg, the parkway passes though the Little Pigeon River Gorge and becomes part of the Foothills Parkway as its spur route, although that roadway has yet to be built in the area (the right of way for it already includes land for a small interchange adjacent to the southern end of the Pigeon Forge city limit).  This  segment, on a narrow strip of National Park Service (NPS) land, is a four-lane divided highway which runs along both banks of the northward-flowing Little Pigeon River.  Where the river briefly diverts to the west and back east again, the southbound lanes on the west bank also curve around, while the northbound lanes go through a tunnel. The Gatlinburg visitor center is located just before entering the town from the north. The Gatlinburg Bypass, part of the Great Smoky Mountains National Park, connects with the parkway to provide a direct access to the National Park. All of these parkways are operated as part of the Great Smoky Mountains National Park, unlike other separate national parkways, with support for design and road construction (including repaving) from the Federal Highway Administration (FHWA) through the Public Lands Transportation Program (PLTP) as in other national parks.

Entering Pigeon Forge, the NPS corridor ends and the route widens to six lanes. A short distance later is an intersection with SR 448, which serves as an alternative route to the parkway between Pigeon Forge and Sevierville. A short distance beyond this point, US 321 splits off to the east, heading towards Maryville.

Upon entering Sevierville, the parkway splits into an east and west branch, which together encircle the business district of Sevierville, as well as a spur in both directions along U.S. 411. Northbound traffic is directed along the east branch, which contains three northbound lanes and one southbound lane, and southbound traffic along the west branch, which contains three southbound lanes and one northbound lane. In this split section, both north and southbound lanes intersect with US 411, where US 441 splits of into a concurrency with US 411 to the east. At this intersection, the parkway becomes part of SR 66, and is known as Winfield Dunn Parkway.

The parkway continues north for several more miles through a less-developed area, before reaching an intersection with SR 139. A few miles later, the parkway reaches its northern terminus at the Exit 407 diverging diamond interchange with Interstate 40 in the community of Kodak. The route continues to the north as a county-maintained surface street, and SR 66 splits off onto an unsigned concurrency with I-40 to the east.

Christmas displays

Within the towns, the road is decorated with Christmas lights all winter. As a six-lane divided highway through Pigeon Forge, very tall multi-fixture street lights in the median are decorated with white LED snowflakes that "fall" down the poles. In Gatlinburg, white LED deciduous trees sprout from the lampposts, in addition to other displays, such as the large one that stretches across the road at the town's northern entrance. In Sevierville, the traditional and much brighter snowflake light sculptures are still in use.

History
In 1924, State Route 71 was established between Indian Gap at the North Carolina state line and the present intersection of with US 411 and 441 (then SR 65) in Sevierville. This road followed the approximately location of the Road Prong Trail between Indian Gap and the Chimney Tops trailhead. In 1932, SR 71 was rerouted onto the present-day road between Newfound Gap and Gatlinburg. After the establishment of the Great Smoky Mountains National Park in 1934 and subsequent dedication in 1940, the state began pushing for a U.S. Route designation through the park. On September 14, 1945, a $9 million plan to improve roads within and around the park was announced by the Bureau of Public Roads, predecessor to the Federal Highway Administration, which included the construction of a four-lane highway between the park entrance in Gatlinburg and Knoxville. In the late 1940s, the stretch of SR 71 through Pigeon Forge was moved onto a new alignment. In late 1951, the American Association of State Highway Officials (AASHO) approved redesignating the section between Newfound Gap and Sevierville as part of US 441, and SR 71 became a hidden designation.

In the mid-1950s, the stretch of the parkway through Pigeon Forge was widened to four lanes. The stretch along the Little Pigeon River between Gatlinburg and Pigeon Forge was widened to four lanes in the late 1950s.

The northernmost segment of the parkway between Sevierville and I-40 was widened from four to six lanes in three phases with funding from the American Recovery and Reinvestment Act. Phase 1, between Nichols Street and SR 338, began on July 15, 2009, and was completed on November 18, 2011, at a cost of $38.6 million. Phase 2, between SR 139 and I-40, began in September 2010 and was completed in November 2012 at a cost of $23.3 million. Phase 3, between SR 338 and SR 139 began in March 2012, and was expected to be completed by October 31, 2014. This project was delayed to the summer of 2016 and cost $32.5 million. The interchange with I-40 was reconstructed into a diverging diamond interchange between March 12, 2014, and June 30, 2015.

Junctions list

See also

References

External links
 Great Smoky Mountains Parkway Editorial/attractions page by DiscoverTheSmokies.com

Transportation in Sevier County, Tennessee
Parkways in the United States
State highways in Tennessee
U.S. Route 441